The Oil-for-Food Program Hearings were held by the U.S Senate Permanent Subcommittee on Investigations beginning in 2004 to investigate abuses of the United Nations (UN) Oil-for-Food Programme in which the economically sanctioned country of Iraq was intended to be able to sell limited amounts of oil in exchange for vital food and medicine for its population.

In December 2004, the subcommittee's chairman Senator Norm Coleman called for UN Secretary-general Kofi Annan to resign because of the "UN's utter failure to detect or stop Saddam's abuses" of the program and because of related fraud allegations against Annan's son.

In May 2005, the subcommittee held the hearings on their investigation of abuses of the program, including oil smuggling, illegal kickbacks and use of surcharges, and Saddam Hussein's use of oil vouchers for the purpose of buying influence abroad. These hearings covered certain corporations and several well-known political figures, including Russia's Vladimir Zhirinovsky and drew significant media attention for the combative appearance of British politician George Galloway, an anti-Iraq-War member of parliament for RESPECT The Unity Coalition (Respect), who vigorously denied the subcommittee's allegations against him and said they were politically motivated.

U.S. oil company Bayoil was among the corporations investigated by the committee, and its executive David Chalmers was convicted of conspiracy to commit wire fraud.

Alleged US corporate complicity

It has also been alleged that the American government was aware of the scandal and chose to not prevent the smuggling because their allies Turkey and Jordan benefited from the majority of the smuggled oil. US Senator Carl Levin (D-Michigan) is quoted in an interview for the New York Times as saying, "There is no question that the bulk of the illicit oil revenues came from the open sale of Iraqi oil to Jordan and to Turkey, and that that was a way of going around the Oil-for-Food Programme [and that] we were fully aware of the bypass and looked the other way."

Galloway testimony 

"We have your name on Iraqi documents, some prepared before the fall of Saddam, some after, that identify you as one of the allocation holders," Senator Coleman accused MP Galloway in May 2005. "I am not now nor have I ever been an oil trader" retorted Galloway, stating that the charges were false and part of a diversionary "mother of all smoke screens" by pro-Iraq-War U.S. politicians to deflect attention from the "theft of billions of dollars of Iraq's wealth... on your watch" that had occurred not during the Oil-for-Food program but under the post-invasion Coalition Provisional Authority by "Halliburton and other American corporations... with the connivance of your own government." Galloway claimed that the subcommittee's dossier was full of distortions and rudimentary mistakes, citing, for example, the charge that he had met with Saddam Hussein "many times" when the number was two. This unusual appearance of a British MP before a US Senate committee drew much media attention in both America and Britain.

The Majority Staff of the subcommittee prepared a subsequent report pertaining to Galloway, which was released in October, 2005. It elaborated on allegations and evidence of the committee and included disputed  testimony from former Iraqi foreign minister Tariq Aziz. It also alleges that another officer of Mariam Appeal, Amineh Abu-Zayyad (Galloway's then-wife), received $150,000 in oil kickbacks, which she denies. Senator Coleman conveyed these reports to the U.S. Department of Justice, the Manhattan DA, the Washington DC and New York federal prosecutors, the UK Parliamentary Commissioner for Standards, and the Charity Commission. None saw fit to pursue charges.

Australian Wheat Board Involvement

The subcommittee considered and may have done some preliminary work to investigate Australian Wheat Board (AWB) in connection with Oil-for-Food Program abuses. The Australian ambassador to the U.S., Michael Thawley, met with Sen. Coleman in late 2004 to lobby against any investigation of AWB.  On June 2, 2006, Coleman responded to criticism that he had insufficiently investigated them by saying that there were legal and cost hurdles. Iowa Senator Tom Harkin and others had claimed it was a political favor being paid back. The Australian Prime Minister John Howard was a supporter of the invasion of Iraq.

Indictments and conviction

On January 6, 2006, South Korean businessman Tongsun Park was arrested by the FBI in Houston after he was indicted for illegally accepting millions of dollars from Iraq in the UN Oil-for-Food Programme. The criminal charges against him were unsealed in a U.S. District Court in Manhattan. In July 2006, he was convicted on conspiracy charges. He became the first person convicted through the oil-for-food investigation. On February 22, 2007 he was sentenced to five years in prison. He was also fined $15,000 and required to forfeit $1,200,000.

On January 16, 2007, former UN official Benon Sevan was indicted by a Manhattan federal prosecutor for taking about $160,000 in bribes. Michael J. Garcia, the U.S. attorney from the Southern District of New York, issued a warrant through Interpol for the arrest of Sevan at his home in Cyprus, as well as a warrant for Efraim "Fred" Nadler, a New York businessman who was indicted on charges of channelling the illegal payments to Sevan. Nadler's whereabouts are unknown.

See also
 Australia's Cole Inquiry

References

United Nations Oil-for-Food scandal
2004 in American politics
2004 in international relations